The North Texas Mean Green college football team represents the University of North Texas in the West Division of Conference USA (CUSA). The Mean Green compete as part of the National Collegiate Athletic Association (NCAA) Division I Football Bowl Subdivision. The program has had 20 head coaches since it began play during the 1913 season. The current head coach of the Mean Green, Eric Morris, was hired in December 2022.

The team has played more than 1,000 games over 100 seasons. In that time, only four Head Coaches have led the Mean Green to post season bowl games and played in the New Orleans Bowl four different times. North Texas has a 2–5 record in seven bowl games in which they have competed in. The Mean Green have been conference champions 25 times in their program history; in many of the conferences the program has been in from the Lone Star Conference to the Sun Belt Conference.

Mitchell spent the most seasons (21) as the Mean Green’s head coach and took the program to its first post season play. The highest winning percentage by any coach is by James W. St. Clair, who was the head coach of the team from 1915–1919, who went 20–10–2 (.656) in his career. The lowest winning percentage for any coach is Todd Dodge, who has gone 6–37 (.139) from 2007–2010.

Key

List of head coaches

Notes

References

North Texas

North Texas Mean Green football coaches